Barry is an American dark comedy crime drama television series created by Alec Berg and Bill Hader that premiered on HBO on March 25, 2018. Hader stars as Barry Berkman, a hitman from Cleveland who travels to Los Angeles to kill someone but finds himself joining an acting class taught by Gene Cousineau (Henry Winkler), where he meets aspiring actress Sally Reed (Sarah Goldberg) and begins to question his path in life as he deals with his criminal associates such as Monroe Fuches (Stephen Root) and NoHo Hank (Anthony Carrigan). The second season premiered on March 31, 2019. In April 2019, HBO renewed the series for a third season, which premiered on April 24, 2022. The series was renewed for an eight-episode fourth and final season, which is set to premiere on April 16, 2023.

Barry has received critical acclaim, with most praise going to its directing, writing, originality, humor, characters, and performances (particularly Hader's). The series has received various accolades, including 44 Primetime Emmy Award nominations. Hader won Outstanding Lead Actor in a Comedy Series twice, while Winkler won Outstanding Supporting Actor in a Comedy Series for his performance in the first season. For the second season, Winkler, Root, and Carrigan all received Emmy nominations for Outstanding Supporting Actor, while Goldberg received a nomination for Best Supporting Actress. Hader, Winkler, and Carrigan each received another nomination for the third season. All three seasons of Barry have been nominated for the Primetime Emmy Award for Outstanding Comedy Series.

Premise
Barry follows Barry Berkman, a U.S. Marine and Afghanistan veteran from Cleveland, who works as a hitman. Lonely and dissatisfied with life, he travels to Los Angeles to kill a target and finds a new sense of purpose when he joins a class full of aspiring actors. Despite his efforts to leave behind his criminal history and become an actor himself, he struggles to escape his dark past.

Cast and characters

Main
 Bill Hader as Barry Berkman / Barry Block, a depressed U.S. Marine and Afghanistan veteran turned hitman who finds himself drawn towards human connection among a community of aspiring actors. A mentally unstable yet exceptional assassin, Barry longs to put his criminal history behind him to become a full-time performer, but can't seem to stop his bloody past from creeping into the new life he tries to build for himself. The character’s struggle with anxiety in a profession he’s gifted in was inspired by Hader’s tenure as a cast member on Saturday Night Live.
 Stephen Root as Monroe Fuches, an old family friend of Barry's who groomed him for a career as a hitman after Barry left the Marines. Fuches is cowardly, manipulative, and self-centered, refusing to believe he’s been anything but good to Barry, despite consistently abusing him whilst dragging his protege back into a life of crime to serve his own personal interest, be it money, power, or revenge.
 Sarah Goldberg as Sally Reed, an aspiring and talented but struggling actress from Joplin, Missouri, in Barry's acting class who becomes romantically involved with him to dysfunctional results. Seemingly good-natured but extremely selfish and envious, Sally is focused on becoming a famous actress while frequently alternating between bouts of narcissism and self-hatred as both a person and an artist. She later creates and stars in her own TV series based on her life, titled Joplin.
 Glenn Fleshler as Goran Pazar (season 1; guest season 3), the leader of the Chechen mafia who employs Barry to kill a man who has been sleeping with his wife.
 Anthony Carrigan as NoHo Hank, an effusively positive and naive member of the Chechen mafia and Goran's right-hand man. Hank quickly becomes attached to Barry, who does not reciprocate his attempts at friendship. He later becomes the leader of the Chechen mafia himself, but struggles with the responsibility of running an organized crime ring when he is not an inherently violent person. Originally planned to die in the pilot, Carrigan’s performance impressed the show’s creators enough that his character was spared and made a series regular.
 Henry Winkler as Gene Cousineau, an eccentric acting coach and Barry's mentor, whose glory days as a performer are long behind him, having alienated his industry colleagues and loved ones. Cousineau is incredibly self-obsessed, and rarely seems to help out his students unless there is something of value in it for him. Despite this, Gene makes a connection with and serves as a father figure to Barry, helping him come to terms with some of the atrocities he has committed throughout his life.
 Sarah Burns as Detective Mae Dunn (seasons 3–present; recurring: season 2), a naïve and obtuse investigator who becomes Loach's partner.

Recurring

 Paula Newsome as Detective Janice Moss (season 1; guest: season 2), a police officer investigating the murder of Ryan Madison.
 John Pirruccello as Detective John Loach (seasons 1–2), Moss's perpetually depressed partner who later finds himself investigating Barry.
 Michael Irby as Cristobal Sifuentes, the leader of the Bolivian mafia, and later Hank's love interest.
 D'Arcy Carden as Natalie Greer, an actress and Sally's friend. Natalie often serves as Cousineau's personal assistant during acting class, and later becomes Sally's assistant on her television series.
 Gary Kraus as Chief Krauss, the chief of police, nicknamed the 'Big Cat'.
 Kirby Howell-Baptiste as Sasha Baxter (seasons 1–2), a British actress in Cousineau's acting class.
 Darrell Britt-Gibson as Jermaine Jefrint, an actor in Cousineau's acting class.
 Andy Carey as Eric (seasons 1–2), an actor in Cousineau's class with a proclivity for slam poetry and rap, neither of which he has any talent for.
 Alejandro Furth as Antonio Manuel (seasons 1–2), a Puerto Rican actor in Cousineau's class.
 Rightor Doyle as Nick Nicholby, a flamboyantly gay actor in Cousineau's class.
 Mark Ivanir as Vacha / Ruslan (season 1; guest: season 3), twin brothers and Chechen assassins working for Goran. Ruslan is a sadistic and skilled torturer but considered overly theatrical and irritating by his colleagues.
 Chris Marquette as Chris Lucado (season 1; guest: season 3), a former Marine logistics officer and one of Barry's only friends.
 Karen David as Sharon Lucado (seasons 1 & 3), Chris' wife
 Dale Pavinski as Taylor Garrett (season 1), a former soldier and one of Chris' friends.
 Marcus Brown as Vaughn (season 1), a former soldier and Chris and Taylor's friend.
 Robert Curtis Brown as Mike Hallman (season 1), a talent agent who helps Sally book acting auditions.
 Cameron Britton as Simmer (season 1)
 Jessy Hodges as Lindsay Mandel (seasons 2–3), Sally's agent.
 Nikita Bogolyubov as Mayrbek (season 2; guest: season 3), a star pupil of the new Chechen army and Barry's protégé, earning him the nickname "Baby Barry”.
 Troy Caylak as Akhmal (seasons 2–3), a member of the Chechen mafia who often serves as Hank's right-hand man.
 JB Blanc as Batir (seasons 2–3), a Chechen mobster and Hank's immediate boss.
 Nick Gracer as Yandar (seasons 2–3), a member of the Chechen mafia
 James Hiroyuki Liao as Special Agent Albert Nguyen (seasons 2–3), a former Marine who served alongside Barry. He later arrives in LA to help investigate Moss' death as an FBI agent.
 Andrew Leeds as Leo Cousineau (seasons 2–3), Gene's estranged son and an organic farmer.
 Patricia Fa'asua as Esther (season 2; guest: season 3), the Burmese gang leader.
 Elizabeth Perkins as Diane Villa (season 3), a major TV producer and head of streaming service BanShe.
 Elsie Fisher as Katie (season 3), a teenage actress playing the role of Chloe in Sally's TV series Joplin
 Miguel Sandoval as Fernando (season 3), the head of the Bolivian mafia and Cristobal’s father-in-law.
 Eli Michael Kaplan as Gordon Cousineau (season 3), Gene's grandson and Leo's son.
 Laura San Giacomo as Annie (season 3), a theater director and Gene's ex-girlfriend.
 Fred Melamed as Tom Posorro (season 3), Gene's agent.
 Robert Wisdom as Jim Moss (season 3), Janice's father.
 Jolene Van Vugt as Traci (season 3), Taylor's sister.
 Patrick Fischler as Lon Oneil (season 4)

Guest
 Tyler Jacob Moore as Ryan Madison, an actor in Gene's class that Barry is hired to kill ("Chapter One: Make Your Mark")
 Melissa Villaseñor as a diner waitress aspiring to be an actress ("Chapter One: Make Your Mark")
 Larry Hankin as Stovka, a renowned Chechen assassin ("Chapter Three: Make the Unsafe Choice")
 Jon Hamm as himself ("Chapter Four: Commit... to YOU")
 Michael Beach as Police Detective ("The Power of No")
 Patrick Fabian as Space Dad ("The Power of No")
 Sam Ingraffia as Thomas Friedman ("Past = Present x Future Over Yesterday")
 Daniel Bernhardt as Ronny Proxin, a deadly mixed martial artist that Barry is hired to kill ("ronny/lily")
 Jessie Giacomazzi as Lily Proxin, Ronny's daughter who is also skilled in martial arts ("ronny/lily")
 Jay Roach as himself ("The Audition")
 Allison Jones as herself ("The Audition", "limonada")
 Mark-Paul Gosselaar as himself, the star of Laws of Humanity ("ben mendelsohn")
 Annabeth Gish as Julie, the widow of one of Barry's victims ("all the sauces", "crazytimesh*tshow")
 Joe Mantegna as himself ("all the sauces", "crazytimesh*tshow")
 Michael Ironside as Andrei, Boss of Chechen mafia ("crazytimesh*tshow")
 Krizia Bajos as Elena, Fernando's daughter and Cristobal's wife ("crazytimesh*tshow", "starting now")
 Vanessa Bayer as Morgan Dawn-Cherry, a BanShe executive who offers Sally a writer's room job ("710N")

Episodes

Season 1 (2018)

Season 2 (2019)

Season 3 (2022)

Season 4

Production

Development
On January 11, 2016, it was reported that HBO had given the production a pilot order, to be directed by Bill Hader who would also co-write and executive produce alongside Alec Berg. On June 2, 2016, it was reported that HBO had given the production a series order. On April 12, 2018, HBO renewed the series for a second season, which premiered on March 31, 2019. On April 10, 2019, HBO renewed the series for a third season which premiered on April 24, 2022. On May 19, 2022, HBO renewed the series for an eight-episode fourth season with Hader directing all eight episodes. In March 2023, it was confirmed season four would be its last.

Casting
Alongside the report of the pilot order, it was confirmed that Hader would star in the pilot. In February 2016, it was reported that Sarah Goldberg, Glenn Fleshler, Anthony Carrigan, Henry Winkler, and Stephen Root had been cast in lead roles in the series' pilot. For the third season, Sarah Burns was promoted to series regular after having a recurring role in the second season.

Filming
Principal photography for the first season began in 2017 in Los Angeles. The second season filmed from September 2018 to December 2018.

Production on the third season was shut down on March 18, 2020, due to the COVID-19 pandemic, before a single episode had been shot. The cast had already gathered for table reads for the first two episodes when they were informed. In January 2021, Hader revealed that scripts for seasons 3 and 4 had been written. Filming for the third season began in August 2021. Production on the fourth season began in June 2022 in Los Angeles.

Release

Marketing
On December 4, 2017, HBO released the first teaser trailer for the series. On January 9, 2018, HBO released the first official trailer for the series.

Premiere
On March 21, 2018, the series held its official premiere at NeueHouse Hollywood in Los Angeles, California.

On April 28, 2018, episodes one through three were screened during the Series Mania Festival at the Le Majestic cinema in Lille, France. It appeared alongside seven other television programs in the festival's "Best of USA" series of shows.

Reception

Critical response

All three seasons of Barry have received critical acclaim. On the review aggregation website Rotten Tomatoes, the overall series holds a 99% rating. Meanwhile, on Metacritic, which uses a weighted average, the overall series received a score of 88 out of 100.

Season 1
On Rotten Tomatoes, the season holds a 98% rating with an average rating of 8.1/10, based on 82 reviews. The website's critical consensus reads, "PTSD and comedy make strangely endearing bedfellows in Barry, which proves more poignant than its sketch show premise." Metacritic assigned the season a score of 84 out of 100 based on 29 critics, indicating "universal acclaim".

Season 2
On Rotten Tomatoes, the season holds a 100% rating with an average rating of 8.8/10, based on 41 reviews. The website's consensus reads, "Barry follows up a pitch-perfect debut with a second season that balances darkness with comedy while steering clear of antihero overindulgence." On Metacritic, the season has a score 87 out of 100, based on 14 critics, indicating "universal acclaim".

Season 3
On Rotten Tomatoes, the season holds a 99% rating with an average rating of 9.15/10, based on 109 reviews. The website's critics consensus states, "Bill Hader and company can take a well-deserved bow—Barry makes its belated return to the screen without missing a step, retaining its edge as one of television’s funniest and most unsettling offerings." On Metacritic, the season has a score 94 out of 100, based on 19 critics, indicating "universal acclaim".

Ratings

Season 1

Season 2

Season 3

Awards and nominations

Notes

References

External links

 
 

2010s American black comedy television series
2010s American comedy-drama television series
2010s American crime drama television series
2018 American television series debuts
2020s American black comedy television series
2020s American comedy-drama television series
2020s American crime drama television series
English-language television shows
HBO original programming
Peabody Award-winning television programs
Primetime Emmy Award-winning television series
Psychological drama television and other works
Serial drama television series
Television series about actors
Television series about organized crime
Television series by Home Box Office
Television series created by Alec Berg
Television series created by Bill Hader
Television shows set in Los Angeles
Works about contract killers
Works about the Russian Mafia